"Running Around Town" is a song by German artist Billie Ray Martin, the former lead singer of Electribe 101, and was released in 1995 as the second single from her debut solo album, Deadline for My Memories (1995). Written by Martin, it reached moderate success on the charts in Europe, peaking at number ten in Italy, number 19 in Finland and number 29 in the UK. It also reached number three on the US Billboard Hot Dance Club Play chart and number 22 on the Billboard Dance Sales chart. A music video was also produced to promote the single.

Critical reception
John Bush from AllMusic described the song as "magical" electro-pop. Larry Flick from Billboard wrote, "Brian "B.T." Transeau produced this smoker with a trance/house urgency that complements Martin's expectedly melodramatic performance. The two were behind the board for the easily programmable Jacob's Ladder remix." In his weekly UK chart commentary in Dotmusic, James Masterton felt the track "somehow lacks the charm of its predecessor". A reviewer from The Irish Times noted its "wonderful sweep". Music Week gave it three out of five, adding, "Martin's voice isn't to all tastes but she works with the right producers (BT in this case), and this uptempo dance record has claims on a chart place." The RM Dance Update declared it as "another great vocal performance and a club smash". An editor, James Hamilton, called it a "trancey groove". J.D. Considine for Vibe said that the singer "adds oomph" to a "hard-thumping workout".

Track listing
 12" single, UK
 "Running Around Town" (BT's Jacobs Ladder Mix) — 13:13
 "Running Around Town" (BT's Shelter Mix) — 7:01
 "Running Around Town" (Extended Mix) — 5:27

 CD single, UK & Europe
 "Running Around Town" (7" Mix) — 3:57
 "Running Around Town" (BT's Jacobs Ladder Mix) — 13:09
 "Your Loving Arms" (Brothers in Rhythm Edited Club Mix) — 6:49

 CD maxi, US
 "Running Around Town" (7" Mix) — 3:55
 "Running Around Town" (BT's Jacobs Ladder Mix) — 13:12
 "Running Around Town" (Extended Mix) — 5:27
 "Running Around Town" (BT's Shelter Mix) — 7:01
 "Running Around Town" (Junior's Mix) — 11:04
 "Your Loving Arms" (Brothers in Rhythm Edited Club Mix) — 6:49

Charts

References

 

1995 singles
1995 songs
Magnet Records singles
Electronic songs
House music songs
Trance songs
English-language German songs